The A-League Men is the premier professional association football league in Australia. Founded in 2005, the 2013–14 season saw an average 13,041 spectators between the 10 teams, the second-highest average attendance in league history. In 2013 the league had the fourth-highest average attendance among Australian football code crowds. Attendances are predicted to hit an all time low after the December 12 2022 decision to hold the grand final in Sydney for the next three years upset many thousands of fans. Many fans and active supporter groups are currently organising walkouts and boycotts for the round starting on Friday December 16 2022 and continuing for future rounds until the decision is overturned.

Regular season highest attendances

Finals series highest attendances

Highest attendances by individual clubs (regular season only)

Lowest attendances by individual clubs (regular season only)

Seasonal average attendances

Seasonal gate receipts

References

Attendances
A-League